Cydamus is a genus of broad-headed bugs in the family Alydidae, found in the Americas. There are about 15 described species in Cydamus.

Species
These 15 species belong to the genus Cydamus:

 Cydamus abditus Van Duzee, 1925 i c g
 Cydamus adspersipes Stål, 1860 i c g
 Cydamus bolivianus Kormilev, 1953 c g
 Cydamus borealis Distant, 1881 i c g b
 Cydamus celeripes (Berg, 1883) c g
 Cydamus deauratus Distant, 1893 c g
 Cydamus delpontei Kormilev, 1953 c g
 Cydamus femoralis Stål, 1860 c g
 Cydamus inauratus Distant, 1893 c g
 Cydamus kormilevi Schaefer, C. W., 1996 c g
 Cydamus lizeri Kormilev, 1953 c g
 Cydamus minor Kormilev, 1953 c g
 Cydamus picticeps (Stal, 1859) c g
 Cydamus seai Kormilev, 1953 c g
 Cydamus trispinosus (De Geer, 1773) c g

Data sources: i = ITIS, c = Catalogue of Life, g = GBIF, b = Bugguide.net

References

Further reading

External links

Articles created by Qbugbot
Micrelytrinae
Pentatomomorpha genera